Medaeus is a genus of crabs in the family Xanthidae, containing the following species:
Medaeus aztec Davie, 1997
Medaeus danielita Mendoza & Ng, 2010
Medaeus elegans A. Milne-Edwards, 1867
Medaeus grandis Davie, 1993
Medaeus ornatus Dana, 1852
Medaeus pelagius (Glassell, 1936)
Medaeus spinulifer (Rathbun, 1898)

References

Xanthoidea